Day of Infamy is a multiplayer tactical first-person shooter video game developed and published by New World Interactive set during the events of the European Theatre of World War II. It is a spinoff of New World Interactive's previous title Insurgency, from which it takes most of its gameplay elements. Day of Infamy uses Valve's Source Engine.

The game was released for Microsoft Windows, macOS, and Linux on March 23, 2017. The final update for the game was released on December 21, 2017, after which official support and community modding efforts died down. Insurgency: Sandstorm, released in 2018 by New World Interactive as a sequel to Insurgency, contains many of the features introduced in Day of Infamy, and can be considered its spiritual successor.

Gameplay
Day of Infamy draws much of its gameplay from Insurgency. Day of Infamy lacks a crosshair, HUD map, and on certain servers, a kill feed. Players can die very quickly from very few shots. Respawns occur in waves to simulate reinforcements (when the team has these waves available). Each player gets a number of Supply Points they can spend on weapons and gear for their soldier, a class in each team to select and a weight system which affects stamina and player speed. Each team receives a certain number of reinforcement waves dependent on game mode, and gains supply points by completing map objectives and killing players from the opposing team.

Players are divided into two teams: Allies (United States Army, British Army, Canadian Army, Second Australian Imperial Force, British Indian Army) and Axis (Wehrmacht). Each map selects one of these default armies per team for players to use, though certain military units can be purchased using real money and used on maps where they were actually deployed in real life (for example, the map "Dog Red", set on Omaha Beach, pits the U.S. Army against the Wehrmacht; for the Allies, the 1st Infantry Division can be purchased and used on this map).

There are nine classes players can choose from: Rifleman, Assault, Support, Flamethrower, Engineer, Machinegunner, Sniper, Radioman, and Officer. Each class has mostly unique armaments, equipment, and attachments to suit their roles, such as long-range scopes for Sniper, submachine guns for Assault, or deployable ammunition packs for Support. The Officer and Radioman classes are designed to work together to request fire support, a teamwork-oriented feature introduced in this game where the Officer can request special assistance such as artillery, aircraft strafes, or dive bomber strikes.

Game modes

Battles/Casual 

 Frontline: Both teams must fight over and capture five objectives on the map. Each team has a Radio at their base, which can be destroyed by the enemy team. Teams gain or lose reinforcement waves by completing or losing objectives. The match ends if a team holds the most objectives by the end of the match time limit, destroys the enemy's Radio, or depletes the enemy's reinforcements.
 Invasion: The attacking team must sequentially advance through objectives that are held by the defending team, which has more reinforcement waves. The defending team's final objective has an HQ Radio; once this objective is active, they lose their reinforcement waves and must protect the Radio. The attacking team wins if they destroy the enemy's Radio or eliminate the enemy team; the defending team wins if they manage to hold the line or deplete the attacking team's reinforcements.
 Offensive: Invasion, except the defending team has infinite reinforcements. However, they must regroup at their spawn to reinforce their team, which can allow the attacking team to advance. The attacking team is not changed.
 Liberation: Similar to Frontline, there are five objectives that must be captured; however, they may be captured in any order at any time. Bonuses are given for taking objectives behind enemy lines. The match ends if a team holds the most objectives by the end of the match time limit or depletes the enemy's reinforcements.

Special Assignments 

 Intel: A capture the flag-esque mode, where the attacking team must capture an intelligence folder from the defending team, who must stop them and protect the folder.
 Firefight: Similar to Liberation, there are five objectives that may be captured in any order at any time. However, dead players can only respawn if their team has captured an objective. The match ends if a team holds the most objectives by the end of the match time limit or depletes the enemy's reinforcements.
 Sabotage: The attacking team must destroy targets on the map (specifically anti-aircraft weapons and fuel depots), while the defending team must stop them and protect the targets. The attacking team wins if they destroy all of the targets; the defending team wins if they successfully protect the targets.

Co-op 

 Stronghold: Similar to Invasion, except all players are placed on the attacking team; the defending team consists entirely of bots. Players must sequentially advance through objectives that are held by the defending team, then destroy their Radio.
 Raid: Similar to Sabotage, except all players are placed on the attacking team; the defending team consists entirely of bots. Players must destroy targets on the map while repelling the defending team.
 Entrenchment: Similar to Offensive, except all players are placed on the defending team; the attacking team consists entirely of bots. Players must hold certain positions on the map while keeping the attacking team at bay for as long as possible.

Development
Day of Infamy began as a free mod developed for their previous title, Insurgency. The mod was released on the Steam Workshop on January 16, 2016, and was updated through May 26, 2016. A closed alpha was released on July 19, 2016. Day of Infamy was approved for release on Steam's Early Access program on July 28, 2016. The game entered the beta phase on December 22, 2016, and left Early Access on March 23, 2017. The game's final update was released on December 21, 2017.

Reception
Day of Infamy received a 77 out of 100 on Metacritic.

References

External links

2017 video games
Linux games
MacOS games
Source (game engine) games
Video games developed in the United States
Video games set in Austria
Video games set in Belgium
Video games set in France
Video games set in Germany
Video games set in Greece
Video games set in Italy
Video games set in Sicily
Windows games
World War II first-person shooters
World War II video games
First-person shooters
Tactical shooter video games
Royal Hamilton Light Infantry (Wentworth Regiment)